Congenital cutaneous candidiasis is a type of candida infection in newborn babies, which appears as generalized red patches and small bumps on the skin or in the mouth, appearing at birth or a few days after birth. It can also occur as more serious widespread disseminated type.

It is caused by Candida (a type of yeast), usually as a complication following premature rupture of membranes in a mother with vaginal thrush. Diagnosis cannot usually be made before birth. It may be suspected by observing white-yellow spots on the placenta and around the umbilical cord. The umbilical cord may have areas of dead tissue or calcification. A sample of the cord under the microscope usually shows inflammation of the blood vessel walls, with lots of white blood cells, and the fungal filaments may be seen when the sample is stained.

It is rare. The earliest known reports of new-born fungal infections in newborns following pregnancy were in the 19th century. The condition was previously known as 'Beck-Ibrahim disease', a term now abandoned due the association of Ibrahim with Nazi euthanasia.

Signs and symptoms
It may present as generalized red patches and small bumps on the skin, appearing at birth or a few days after birth. There may be inflamed eyes, lung infection, and the baby may have swollen vagina and vulva. It can also occur as a more serious widespread disseminated type.

Other features include difficulty breathing, fits, low blood pressure, a distended abdomen, poor feeding, a fluctuating temperature and high sugars.

Diagnosis
Diagnosis cannot usually be made before birth. It may be suspected by observing muddy looking amniotic fluid, or white-yellow spots on the placenta and around the umbilical cord. The umbilical cord may have areas of dead tissue or calcification. A sample of the cord under the microscope usually shows inflammation of the blood vessel walls, with lots of white blood cells, and the fungal filaments may be seen when the sample is stained.

Bilirubin may be high and medical imaging may show evidence of pneumonia.

Cause
It is caused by Candida (a type of yeast), usually as a complication following premature rupture of membranes in a mother with vaginal thrush.

References 

Mycosis-related cutaneous conditions